The Black Music Research Journal was a biannual peer-reviewed academic journal published by the University of Illinois Press on behalf of the Center for Black Music Research at the Columbia College Chicago. It covers the philosophy, aesthetics, history, and criticism of black music. It was established in 1980 by Samuel A. Floyd, Jr. and the editor-in-chief was Horace J. Maxile, Jr. (Columbia College Chicago). The journal was abstracted and indexed in Academic ASAP, Academic OneFile, Arts & Humanities Citation Index, Current Contents/Arts & Humanities, and Expanded Academic ASAP. It ceased publication with volume 36 (2016).

External links 
 Website.
 Center for Black Music Research Website.
 Samuel A. Floyd, Jr. short bio

References

Music journals
University of Illinois Press academic journals
English-language journals
Biannual journals
Publications established in 1980
Publications disestablished in 2016
1980 establishments in Illinois
2016 disestablishments in Illinois
Black studies publications
Music of the African diaspora